Bagarella is an Italian surname. Notable people with the surname include:

 Calogero Bagarella (1935–1969), Sicilian mafioso
 Leoluca Bagarella (born 1942), Sicilian mafioso, brother of Calogero

Italian-language surnames